Dunkirk Light, also known as Point Gratiot Light, is an active lighthouse located at Point Gratiot on Lake Erie in New York state.

The lighthouse was established in 1826 and the current tower was first lit in 1875.  The lighthouse was automated in 1960 and is still operational.  The foundation is made out of dressed stone and the lighthouse is made out of rubblestone encased in brick.  The tower is square-shaped with the upper two thirds in white and the lower third left natural and the lantern housing in red.  The original lens is a third order Fresnel lens installed in 1857 and is still in operation.  Its being still in use makes it a rarity.  Only 70 such lenses are operational in the United States, 16 being on the Great Lakes of which two are in New York.  At the entrance to the park property is the South Buffalo North Side Light, formerly located in Buffalo Harbor. It was added to the National Register of Historic Places as Point Gratiot Lighthouse Complex in 1979.

Cultural 
The Dunkirk Lighthouse is open daily except Sunday. Guided tours include climb to the top of the lighthouse, Veteran museums and gift shop.

The Archives Center at the Smithsonian National Museum of American History has a collection (#1055) of souvenir postcards of lighthouses and has digitized 272 of these and made them available online.  These include postcards of Dunkirk (Point Gratiot) Light  with links to customized nautical charts provided by National Oceanographic and Atmospheric Administration.

References

Further reading 
 Oleszewski, Wes. Great Lakes Lighthouses, American and Canadian: A Comprehensive Directory/Guide to Great Lakes Lighthouses, (Gwinn, Michigan: Avery Color Studios, Inc., 1998) .
 Wright, Larry and Wright, Patricia. Great Lakes Lighthouses Encyclopedia Hardback (Erin: Boston Mills Press, 2006)

External links 
 
 Dunkirk Lighthouse and Veteran's Park Museum – official site
 US-Lighthouses.com

Lighthouses completed in 1826
Lighthouses completed in 1875
Lighthouses on the National Register of Historic Places in New York (state)
Queen Anne architecture in New York (state)
Museums in Chautauqua County, New York
Lighthouse museums in New York (state)
Military and war museums in New York (state)
1826 establishments in New York (state)
National Register of Historic Places in Chautauqua County, New York
Transportation buildings and structures in Chautauqua County, New York
Lighthouses of the Great Lakes